Clayton Forsey , (born August 21, 1953) is a Canadian politician, who represented the district of Exploits in the Newfoundland and Labrador House of Assembly from 2005 to 2015. Forsey is a member of the Progressive Conservative Party and served as the Parliamentary Secretary to the Minister Responsible for Forestry and Agrifoods. He was defeated in the 2015 election.

His brother Pleaman Forsey was elected to represent his former district in 2019.

Electoral record 

|}

|}

|-

|-

|}

 
|PC
|Clayton Forsey
|align="right"|2,605
|align="right"|55.2
|align="right"|
|-

|-

| style="width: 130px" |NDP
|John Whelan
|align="right"|159
|align="right"|3.4
|align="right"|
|- bgcolor="white"
!align="left" colspan=3|Total
!align="right"|4,722
!align="right"|100%
!align="right"|
|}

|-

|-

|-

|NDP
|John Whelan
|align="right"|168 
|align="right"|2.93%  
|align="right"|
|}

References

External links
 Clayton Forsey's PC Party biography

Progressive Conservative Party of Newfoundland and Labrador MHAs
Living people
1953 births
21st-century Canadian politicians